

Ortofon is a Danish manufacturer of electronic audio equipment. It is the world's largest producer of magnetic cartridges for phonograph turntables, with 500,000 cartridges sold annually.

History
The company was founded by engineers Arnold Poulsen and Axel Petersen in 1918. Initially focusing on sound film technology, 
Ortofon began to diversify into gramophone record playback and cutting equipment towards the end of World War II. The firm pioneered the use of moving coil technology in phonograph equipment; the first cutting head based on this technology was introduced  in 1945. Ortofon's first moving coil magnetic cartridge, the AB model, was launched in 1948, and similar variations of that product are still manufactured today due to demand from enthusiasts. 1959 the first Stereo Pick-Up SPU, which aimed at professionals, appeared. This pick-up is produced in different versions until today, for example SPU Meister in 	1992, SPU 95th Anniversary in 2015.  When Ortofon turned 80 years old, the MC Jubilee was introduced; first time Ortofon used a metal housing manufactured with Metal injection molding.
2000, on the occasion of the 250th anniversary of the death of  the composer Johann Sebastian Bach, a MC-Series "Kontrapunkt" was presented. The models were named b, a, c, and h, wherein the b has a cantilever made of ruby. For the frame of the housing stainless steel was used. Successor of these pickups became the Cadenza-series in 2009. Regarding the cantilever the Anna Diamond that appeared in 2019 should be mentioned: its cantilever is made of diamond.

The first Moving magnet-pickup M-15 was launched in 1969; here Ortofon used first time the Variable Magnetic Shunt (VMS) generating system which is patented and used until the 1980s too. In 1979 Ortofon presented the DJ-pickup Concorde in a new unusual design. 2007 Ortofon introduced the moving magnet-series 2M. Its design of the housing remembers facets of a diamond; it was created in collaboration with the Dane Moeller Jensen. 2018 the 2nd generation of the Concorde was released.

DJs currently account for three-quarters of Ortofon's cartridge sales, the remainder being sold for audiophile and consumer audio use. Low-cost Ortofon cartridges, such as the OM-5E, are often supplied as standard on budget-priced consumer turntables, including the Pro-Ject Debut range. The Ortofon OM series stylus assemblies are interchangeable, allowing users to easily mount a more expensive stylus on a cheaper cartridge.

The 2020 presented Revox Studiomaster T700 is delivered with an Quintet Bronze MC.

Company since 2004 
In 2004 the company was taken over by a group of private investors.

Since 2010 there is Ortofon Microtech, that manufactures custom-made high-precision TPE and Technical Rubber components and components for Hearing Aids industry. In the year 2013 Ortofon Microtech consequently got certified for ISO 13485.

Selection of pickups

See also
 List of phonograph manufacturers

References

External links

External links

Phonograph manufacturers
Electronics companies established in 1918
1918 establishments in Denmark
Danish brands
Audio equipment manufacturers of Denmark
DJ equipment